The 1873 Grand National was the 35th renewal of the Grand National horse race that took place at Aintree near Liverpool, England, on 27 March 1873.

Finishing Order

Non-finishers

References

 1873
Grand National
Grand National
19th century in Lancashire